Mecyna marcidalis is a species of moth in the family Crambidae. It is found in France, Azerbaijan, as well as the Near East, including Turkey, Syria, Iran and the Palestinian territories.

References

Moths described in 1879
Spilomelinae
Moths of Europe